Scorțaru Nou is a commune located in Brăila County, Muntenia, Romania. It is composed of four villages: Gurguieți, Pitulați, Scorțaru Nou and Sihleanu. It formerly included Deșirați and Nicolae Bălcescu villages, now depopulated.

References

Communes in Brăila County
Localities in Muntenia